John Ogden (19 September 1609 – 30 May 1682), known as "The Pilgrim", was an early settler in New England, originally on Long Island, and an original patentee of the Elizabethtown Purchase, "the first English settlement in the Colony of New Jersey."

Early life
John Ogden was born in England on 19 September 1609, and emigrated to New England in 1641. His parentage and town of birth are unknown.  Previous histories showing that he was born in Hampshire are unfounded and were the result of a fraudulent genealogy created by Gustave Anjou in the early 1900s.  Almost all the John Ogdens of his time were born in the north of England, especially Lancashire.

British America
After arriving in the American Colony around 1640, he moved to Stamford, Connecticut, then called Rippowam, where he constructed a dam and grist mill. In 1642, he  built "the first permanent stone church in Fort Amsterdam," a Dutch settlement at the southern tip of what is now Manhattan Island.  In 1644 he relocated to Long Island, where "he established the first commercial whaling enterprise in America."

In 1665, he became a patentee of the Elizabethtown Purchase in present-day Elizabeth, New Jersey, where he lived until his death in 1682.

Personal life
While still in England, Ogden married Jane Bond (1616–1682) on May 8, 1637. Together, the couple had six children:

 John Ogden Jr. (1638–1702)
 David Ogden (1639–1692)
 Jonathan Ogden (1639–1732)
 Joseph Ogden (1642–before 1690)
 Benjamin Ogden (1654–1722)
 Mary Ogden (dates unknown).

Ogden died in Elizabeth, New Jersey on 30 May 1682.  He is buried in what is now the First Presbyterian Churchyard in Elizabeth.

Legacy and descendants
A 1907 book The Ogden family in America, Elizabethtown branch, and their English ancestry; John Ogden, the Pilgrim, and his descendants, 1640-1906 by William Ogden Wheeler, is very full and accurate for events after their arrival in America, quoting many original documents, but has the fraudulent genealogy mentioned above.

No less than eight of his descendants with the surname Ogden appear in the Dictionary of American Biography, besides many with other surnames. Two members of the Ogden family appears as millionaires in the American Millionaire Registry of 1892, making them billionaires in 2022 money.

His descendants include :

Abraham Ogden (1743-1798), Colonel, U.S. Attorney for the District of New Jersey, negotiator of the Treaty of New York (1796)
Samuel Ogden (1746-1810), Entrepreneur, brother-in-law of Founding Father Gouverneur Morris
Aaron Ogden (1756-1839), United States Senator and 5th Governor of New Jersey
David A. Ogden (1770-1829), died in Montreal, Entrepreneur and politician, partner of Founding Father Alexander Hamilton
Peter Skene Ogden (1790-1854), born in Quebec, Canada, was a British-Canadian fur trader, under the company of John Jacob Astor
William Butler Ogden (1805-1877), 1st Mayor of Chicago, was one of the richest man in Chicago
Robert N. Ogden Jr. (1839-1905), Lieutenant Colonel, father-in-law of the Mayor of Chicago Carter Harrison Jr.

References

1609 births
1682 deaths
People of colonial New Jersey